Burnsius is a genus of New World checkered-skippers in the butterfly family Hesperiidae. The genus was erected by Nick V. Grishin in 2019. There are about 12 described species in Burnsius.

As a result of a 2019 study of the genomes of 250 representative species of skippers, the genus Burnsius was created to contain 12 related species formerly in the genus Pyrgus.

Species
These 12 species belong to the genus Burnsius:
 Burnsius adepta (Plötz, 1884) (Central American checkered-skipper)
 Burnsius albescens (Plötz, 1884) (white checkered-skipper)
 Burnsius brenda (Evans, 1942) (Brenda checkered-skipper)
 Burnsius chloe (Evans, 1942) (Chloe checkered-skipper)
 Burnsius communis (Grote, 1872) (common checkered-skipper)
 Burnsius crisia (Herrich-Schäffer, 1865) (Antillean checkered-skipper)
 Burnsius notatus (Blanchard, 1852)
 Burnsius oileus (Linnaeus, 1767) (tropical checkered-skipper)
 Burnsius orcus (Stoll, 1780) (orcus checkered-skipper)
 Burnsius orcynoides (Giacomelli, 1928)
 Burnsius philetas (Edwards, 1881) (desert checkered-skipper)
 Burnsius titicaca (Reverdin, 1921) (Peruvian checkered-skipper)

References

Further reading

 
 
 
 

Pyrgini